This article displays the squads for the 2017 World Men's Handball Championship. Each team consisted of 16 players.

Age, caps and goals correct as of 11 January 2017.

Group A

Brazil
The squad was announced on 22 December 2016.

Head coach: Washington Nunes

France
A 21-player squad was announced on 9 December 2016. The final squad was revealed on 10 January 2017.

Head coach: Didier Dinart/Guillaume Gille

Japan
A 19-player squad was announced on 19 December 2016.

Head coach: Antonio Carlos Ortega

Norway
A 17-player squad was announced on 12 December 2016. Harald Reinkind was replaced by Magnus Abelvik Rød because of an injury on 4 January 2017. On 19 January 2017, Ole Erevik was replaced by Petter Øverby.

Head coach: Christian Berge

Poland
A 21-player squad was announced on 8 December 2016. It was reduced to 19 on 26 December 2016. Piotr Wyszomirski cancelled his participation due to an injury on 29 December 2016. On 2 January 2017, an 18-player squad was revealed after Kamil Syprzak and Michał Szyba were ruled out because of an injury. On 8 January 2017, Mariusz Jurkiewicz was ruled out because of an injury.

Head coach: Talant Duyshebaev

Russia
A 21-player squad was announced on 19 December 2016. It was reduced to 17 on 27 December 2016. More players were called up to a 21-player roster on 2 January 2017.

Head coach: Dmitri Torgovanov

Group B

Angola
The squad was announced on 24 December 2016.

Head coach: Filipe Cruz

Iceland
A 23-player squad was announced on 28 December 2016. It was reduced to 19 on 3 January 2017. The final squad was revealed on 9 January 2017.

Head coach: Geir Sveinsson

Macedonia
A 24-player squad was announced on 16 December 2016. It was reduced to 21 on 30 December 2016, and to 19 players on 9 January 2017.

Head coach: Lino Červar

Slovenia
A 21-player squad was announced on 22 December 2016. It was reduced to 17 on 4 January 2017.

Head coach: Veselin Vujović

Spain
A 17-player squad was announced on 20 December 2016. It was renewed on 2 January 2017.

Head coach: Jordi Ribera

Tunisia
A 19-player squad was announced on 25 December 2016.

Head coach: Hafedh Zouabi

Group C

Belarus
A 19-player squad was announced on 19 December 2016. It was reduced to 18 on 27 December 2016.

Head coach: Yuri Shevtsov

Chile
The squad was announced on 26 December 2016.

Head coach: Mateo Garralda

Croatia
A 16-player squad was announced on 27 December 2016, while players from the German League joined in January 2017. On 29 December 2016, Marino Marić was replaced by Krešimir Kozina due to an injury. On 10 January 2017, a 17-player squad announced.

Head coach: Željko Babić

Germany
An 18-player squad was announced on 22 December 2016. The final squad was revealed on 9 January 2017.

Head coach: Dagur Sigurðsson

Hungary
A 28-player squad was announced on 16 December 2016. It was reduced to 18 on 31 December 2016.

Head coach: Xavi Sabaté

Saudi Arabia
A 25-player squad was announced on 30 November 2016.

Head coach: Nenad Kljaić

Group D

Argentina
An 18-player squad was announced on 27 December 2016.

Head coach: Eduardo Gallardo

Bahrain
A 20-player squad was announced on 20 December 2016. It was reduced to 19 on 2 January 2017.

Head coach: Salah Bouchekriou

Denmark
A 19-player squad was announced on 16 December 2016. It was reduced to 17 on 9 January 2017.

Head coach: Guðmundur Guðmundsson

Egypt
A 20-player squad was announced on 25 December 2016. The final squad was revealed on 3 January 2017.

Head coach: Marwan Ragab

Qatar
A 23-player squad was announced on 14 December 2016.

Head coach: Valero Rivera López

Sweden
An 18-player squad was announced on 8 December 2016. Viktor Östlund was replaced by Philip Stenmalm on 28 December 2016 because of an injury.

Head coach: Kristján Andrésson

Statistics

Player representation by league system
League systems with 10 or more players represented are listed. In all, World Cup squad members play for clubs in 31 different countries.

Player representation by club
Clubs with 8 or more players represented are listed.

Coaches representation by country
Coaches in bold represented their own country.

References

World Men's Handball Championship squads
2017 squads